Pommes boulangère or pommes à la boulangère – "baker's potatoes" – is a savoury dish of sliced potato and onion, cooked slowly in liquid in an oven.

Background
The name of the dish is said to derive from an old practice in French villages, where householders without their own ovens would take the prepared dish to the village bakery. After the baker had finished making his bread, the potato dish would cook slowly while the oven gradually died down.

Ingredients and variations
The basic ingredients are potatoes, onions and cooking liquid. The dish, cooked slowly in a low oven, gradually absorbing the cooking liquid, has a crisp top layer of sliced potatoes, with a softer mixture of onion and potato beneath. It is usual to season it with some or all of garlic, herbs (particularly rosemary or sage), salt and pepper, and to top the dish with dabs of butter before cooking, but there are several published variations:

Despite the French name, the dish is not unique to France. The Yorkshire-born chef Brian Turner recalled in his memoirs (2000) being given an identical potato dish in his childhood, and Bobby Freeman in a 1997 book about Welsh cuisine gives a recipe for traditional "Teisen nionod" (onion cake), which she describes as "the same dish as the French pommes boulangère".

When diced bacon is added to the potatos and onions, and the dish is topped with grated cheese before baking, it is known as pommes savoyarde (or alternatively as pommes Chambéry).

Notes, references and sources

Notes

References

Sources

French cuisine
Potato dishes
Casserole dishes